IPW New Zealand Heavyweight Championship is the top professional wrestling championship title in the New Zealand promotion Impact Pro Wrestling. It was the original heavyweight title of the Mania Pro Wrestling promotion, later used in IPW as its primary singles title. It was introduced as the MPW Heavyweight Championship on 9 April 2002. When a new promotion was founded by a core group of MPW wrestlers in 2003, the title was established as its new heavyweight championship.

The promotion became Impact Pro Wrestling and the title became the IPW New Zealand Heavyweight Championship. On 29 May 2010, the title was won by former K-1 kickboxer and "New Zealand's strongest man" Reuben de Jong. The current champion is Jake Shehaan who is in his second reign, which is the longest reign for the title.

The championship is regularly defended throughout New Zealand, most often in central Auckland, at live events such as the Armageddon Expo as well at monthly supercards and on its weekly series IPW Ignited. In 2007, the title made its debut in the Northland Region, with the promotion's IPW Collision event in Whangarei. The title match featured Jon E. King facing off against the Samoan Silverback Alexander. It has also been defended at several interpromotional events both in New Zealand and Australia. IPW Heavyweight Champion Jon E. King competed at the 2006 NZPWI Invitational with KPW Heavyweight Champion H-Flame where both men made it to the semi-finals and where King was eliminated by "Heartless" Alfred Valentine. The 2007 NZPWI Invitational saw the first ever "champion vs. champion" match when returning champions Jon E. King and H-Flame faced each other in a non-title match in the opening rounds. King went on to win the tournament.

The championship is generally contested in professional wrestling matches, in which participants execute scripted endings rather than contend in direct competition. The inaugural champion was The Machine, who defeated Jon E. King in Mangere, Auckland on 9 April 2002 to become the first MPW Heavyweight Champion; King had won a Royal Rumble-type match, eliminating "Superstar" Troy Daniels to earn a place in the championship decider. IPW recognized both MPW Heavyweight Championship reigns when the promotion became Impact Pro Wrestling in 2003. King and Davey Deluxeo hold the record for most reigns, with three each. At 515 days, Deluxeo's first reign was the longest in the title's history. Vinny Dunn's second reign, which lasted mere minutes, was the shortest in the history of the title. Overall, there have been 21 reigns shared between 11 wrestlers, with one vacancy.

The promotion has often been represented by the reigning IPW Champion in the national media. In May 2005, TVNZ's Hadyn Jones conducted an interview with The Machine and then IPW Champion The Economist at their Auckland gym. On 2 February 2006, Jon E. King was a guest on Ngati Hine FM where he was interviewed by disc jockey Darcy Edwards and with fellow IPW wrestler Alfred Valentine on the TV One's morning talk show Breakfast by Kay Gregory that summer. Jordan Invincible was among the wrestlers featured on 10 October 2008 edition Television New Zealand's IAM TV and where Invincible wrestled the host in a mock battle at their IPW facility in Auckland. IPW New Zealand Champion Dal Knox was interviewed at the 2008 Armageddon Expo, along with IPW colour commentator Dion McCracken, as part of an upcoming documentary on professional wrestling in New Zealand, A Kiwi Century On The Mat, in April 2009. Knox was also profiled by 20/20 in a special report on professional wrestling in New Zealand, as well as on the Māori Television sports show Hyundai Code.

Title history

Reigns

Combined reigns 

Footnotes

References

External links
Impact Pro Wrestling's official title history page

National professional wrestling championships
Heavyweight wrestling championships
Professional wrestling in New Zealand